is a Japanese politician who, on 17 March 2017, became the first transgender male politician to be elected to office when he was elected to the city council of Iruma, Saitama.

He underwent gender confirmation surgery in 2015 at the age of 23. After graduating from Teikyo University, he had worked as medical technologist at a hospital in Shizuoka before he was elected.

Notes

References 

Japanese LGBT politicians
Japanese transgender people
Teikyo University alumni
Transgender politicians
Transgender men